Northwood Heights is a neighborhood in the Lake Highlands area of Dallas, Texas (USA). It is generally bounded by Forest Lane on the North, Landa Lane on the West, Skyline Drive on the South, and Shepherd Lane on the East. The neighborhood includes individual residences, apartments, and multiple function dwellings.

External links 
 Lake Highlands Area Improvement Association
 Northwood Heights Homeowners Alliance